Demokraten (meaning The Democrat in English) was a weekly newspaper published from Copenhagen between 6 January and 29 December 1873. It was edited by C. Würtz and W. Rasmussen.

References

1873 establishments in Denmark
1873 disestablishments in Denmark
Danish-language newspapers
Defunct newspapers published in Denmark
Defunct weekly newspapers
Newspapers published in Copenhagen
Publications established in 1873
Publications disestablished in 1873
Weekly newspapers published in Denmark